Lilian Estella Patel (born 1951) is a Malawian politician.  She has represented Mangochi South in the National Assembly for the United Democratic Front since 2014, and previously from 1994 to 2009.

Patel was foreign minister of Malawi from 2000 to 2004. Before that, she served as Minister of Health from 1999 to 2000, and as Minister of Women's and Children's Affairs, Community Development and Social Welfare from 1996 to 1999.  After serving as foreign minister, she was Minister of Labour and Vocational Training from 2004 to 2005.

References

1951 births
Living people
Foreign Ministers of Malawi
Female foreign ministers
20th-century women politicians
21st-century women politicians
Women government ministers of Malawi
Malawian women diplomats

United Democratic Front (Malawi) politicians
Members of the National Assembly (Malawi)